Matilda Bryant Lugg (born 12 November 1999) is an Australian cricketer who plays as a wicket-keeper and right-handed batter for the ACT Meteors in the Women's National Cricket League (WNCL). She joined the Meteors ahead of the 2018–19 WNCL season but did not make an appearance.

Lugg made her debut for the Meteors during the 2019–20 WNCL season, making four appearances in total. She previously played for the Irish team Typhoons in the 2018 Toyota Super 3s.

References

External links

Matilda Lugg at Cricket Australia

1999 births
Living people
Cricketers from New South Wales
Australian women cricketers
ACT Meteors cricketers
Sydney Sixers (WBBL) cricketers
Typhoons (women's cricket) cricketers